The National Hockey League (NHL) Conference Finals are the Eastern Conference and Western Conference championship series of the NHL. The Conference Finals are each a best-of-seven series, and comprise the third round of the Stanley Cup playoffs. The two series are played in mid-to-late May (early June in 1995 and 2013, due to labour disputes that delayed the start of the season and September in 2020 due to the COVID-19 pandemic). The winners of the Eastern and Western Conference Finals receive the Prince of Wales Trophy and Clarence S. Campbell Bowl, respectively, and advance to face each other in the final round.

History

Before the 1967–68 season, the NHL was made up only of a single division. From the 1967–68 season through the 1973–74 season, the NHL was made up of two divisions (as opposed to conferences), the East Division and the West Division.

Following the 1973–74 season, the NHL again realigned. The East and West Divisions were renamed the Prince of Wales and Clarence Campbell Conferences, respectively. At the time, the new conferences and divisions had little to do with North American geography and geographical references were removed. Furthermore, all playoff teams were seeded regardless of conference.

Beginning in the 1981–82 season, the conferences and the playoffs were realigned. The NHL was hoping to reduce travel costs in the face of a struggling economy and high energy prices. The regular season and playoffs were also altered to emphasize divisional match-ups. Thus, the first official Conference Finals were held in 1982.

Beginning in the 1993–94 season, the names of conferences and divisions were changed to reflect their geographic locations. At the instigation of then-new NHL commissioner Gary Bettman, the NHL made the change to help non-hockey fans better understand the game, as the National Basketball Association uses geographic-based names for their conferences and divisions, and the National Football League, and Major League Baseball use geographic-based names for their divisions. Therefore, the Campbell Conference became the Western Conference and the Wales Conference became the Eastern Conference. The winner of the Eastern Conference Finals receives the Prince of Wales Trophy, while the winner of the Western Conference Finals receives the Clarence S. Campbell Bowl. This practice remained until the pandemic-affected 2020–21 season that was played without conferences. The league decided in June 2021 to award the trophies (one per team) to the two victors of the Stanley Cup Semifinals. After this season, the league revived the conferences for the 2021–22 season.

The Hartford Whalers never advanced to a Conference Finals, however after they relocated to become the Carolina Hurricanes, they did so four times (2002 as the eventual Cup finalists, 2006 as the eventual Cup champions, 2009, and 2019). The original Winnipeg Jets never appeared in the Conference Finals, and after moving to become the Phoenix Coyotes the franchise did not even win a playoff series until the 2012 Stanley Cup playoffs when they advanced to the Conference Finals. Of the 32 teams in the NHL, only the Columbus Blue Jackets and Seattle Kraken have never appeared in the Conference Finals.

Conference trophy traditions

Another tradition (or rather superstition) that is prevalent among today's NHL players is that no player should touch the Cup itself until his team has rightfully won the Cup. Adding to this superstition is some players' choice to neither touch nor hoist the conference trophies (Clarence S. Campbell Bowl and Prince of Wales Trophy) when these series have been won; the players feel that the Stanley Cup is the true championship trophy, and only it should be hoisted.

However, in 1994, Stephane Matteau, then of the New York Rangers, admitted that he tapped the Wales Trophy with his stick's blade before the overtime period in Game 7 of the Eastern Conference Finals. Matteau subsequently scored the game-winning goal in double overtime against the New Jersey Devils. Following the game, Mark Messier, the captain of the Rangers, picked up and raised the Wales Trophy after it was awarded to the team. After winning the Western Conference, Vancouver Canucks captain Trevor Linden lifted the Campbell Bowl. The Rangers prevailed over the Canucks in a seven-game series to win the Cup.

Scott Stevens and Martin Brodeur hoisted the conference trophy as well in 2000, after the New Jersey Devils came back from a 3–1 series deficit to defeat the Philadelphia Flyers in seven games; the Devils would go on to defeat the Dallas Stars (who touched but did not lift their conference trophy) in the Stanley Cup Finals. Stevens then also touched the trophy in 2003, after defeating the Ottawa Senators in seven games. Not only touching, Stevens picked up the trophy and made his team take a photo with it. The Devils went on to defeat the Mighty Ducks of Anaheim four games to three in the 2003 Stanley Cup Finals.

In 2002, the Carolina Hurricanes hoisted the Prince of Wales Trophy after they won their conference title; the Hurricanes lost their Finals series with the Detroit Red Wings four games to one. Steve Yzerman, captain of the Red Wings during their 1997, 1998 and 2002 Stanley Cup victories, picked up the Clarence S. Campbell Bowl each time, to the delight of the home fans in Joe Louis Arena.

The superstition held true in 2004, as Jarome Iginla of the Calgary Flames grabbed the Campbell Bowl, but Dave Andreychuk of the Tampa Bay Lightning refused to touch the Prince of Wales Trophy; the Lightning won the Stanley Cup in seven games. The Campbell Bowl would not be picked up on the ice again until it was won by the first-year Vegas Golden Knights in 2018.

In 2007, Daniel Alfredsson and Wade Redden of the Ottawa Senators touched and picked up the Prince of Wales Trophy, respectively, but Anaheim Ducks captain Scott Niedermayer never came close to the Campbell Bowl; the Ducks won the Stanley Cup in five games. Steve Yzerman, captain of the Detroit Red Wings during their 1997, 1998, and 2002 Stanley Cup victories, picked up the Clarence S. Campbell Bowl each time, though his successor Nicklas Lidstrom did not touch it en route to a 2008 Stanley Cup victory. Scott Stevens hoisted the Prince of Wales Trophy during the Devils' other two Stanley Cup-winning seasons in 1995 and 2003. In 2009, 2016, and 2017, Sidney Crosby and other members of the Pittsburgh Penguins carried and posed with the Prince of Wales Trophy before going on to win the Stanley Cup. At the close of the 2010 Eastern Conference Finals, Philadelphia Flyers captain Mike Richards picked up the Wales Trophy. Jonathan Toews, Chicago Blackhawks captain, did not touch the Campbell Bowl, and the Blackhawks went on to defeat the Flyers in six games for the 2010 Stanley Cup.

In 2012, Los Angeles Kings captain Dustin Brown and the rest of the team refused to touch the Campbell Bowl after winning the conference finals against the Phoenix Coyotes. The team did not take the Campbell Bowl trophy on the plane back to Los Angeles. Instead, Tim Leiweke, president and CEO of Anschutz Entertainment Group (the parent of the LA Kings), drove the trophy in his car trunk from Phoenix to Los Angeles and showed it to the more-than 10,000 fans that waited at LAX Airport to show their support to their Stanley Cup finalists, who went on to win the Stanley Cup. This was in marked contrast to 1993, when the Kings had defeated the Toronto Maple Leafs in seven games to reach their first Finals, where Wayne Gretzky and the team celebrated with the Campbell Bowl.

In 2015, the Chicago Blackhawks took a team photo with the Campbell Bowl after winning Game 7 of the 2015 Western Conference Finals against the Anaheim Ducks at the Honda Center in Anaheim. The Blackhawks would end up defeating the Tampa Bay Lightning in six games in the 2015 Stanley Cup Finals. In 2018, Capitals captain Alexander Ovechkin hoisted the Wales trophy after winning the Eastern Conference Finals, before ultimately defeating the Vegas Golden Knights in five games to win the Stanley Cup. In 2020, Tampa Bay Lightning captain Steven Stamkos and his teammates lifted the Prince of Wales Trophy after winning the Eastern Conference Finals. Head coach Jon Cooper stated "we win a trophy, we pick it up", while Victor Hedman acknowledged that not touching the trophy in 2015 "didn't work". The Lightning went on to defeat the Dallas Stars in six games in the Stanley Cup Finals. Stamkos picked up the Prince of Wales Trophy again in 2021 after the Lightning defeated the New York Islanders in the semifinals, and Tampa Bay defended the Stanley Cup by defeating the Montreal Canadiens in five games.

Prince of Wales Conference/Eastern Conference

Prince of Wales Conference (1982–1993)

Eastern Conference (1994–present)

Clarence Campbell Conference/Western Conference

Clarence Campbell Conference (1982–1993)

Western Conference (1994–present)

Team totals
Legend: CF = Conference Finals; SCF = Stanley Cup Finals; Bolded year denotes win; Italicized denotes active series

Note: The Colorado Avalanche's totals include two Conference Finals appearances as the Quebec Nordiques (both losses), and the Dallas Stars' totals include two Conference Finals appearances as the Minnesota North Stars (one win; subsequent Stanley Cup Finals loss). The Arizona Coyotes' only Conference Finals appearance was in 2012 as the Phoenix Coyotes. The Columbus Blue Jackets and the Seattle Kraken remain the only active NHL teams to have never advanced to the Conference Finals.

References

External links
 Playoff Index - Hockey-Reference.com

 
Finals
Finals
Recurring sporting events established in 1982
Conference Finals